The Arenas Blancas Lighthouse is an active lighthouse on the Canary island of La Palma in the municipality of Villa de Mazo, near the village of La Salemera.

It is one of four main lighthouses on La Palma, each one marking a different quadrant of the island. The modern lighthouses of Arenas Blancas and Punta Lava are located on the eastern and western sides of the island. The lighthouses at Punta Cumplida and Fuencaliente are situated on the northern and southern points.

Description 

The need for the lighthouse was identified in the third maritime lighting plan for the Canaries in 1989, as a navigation aid for coastal shipping on the east coast of the island. The light has a range of 20 nautical miles, and has an occulting light characteristic which consists of a pattern of three flashes of white light every eight seconds.

The white cylindrical tower with a curved tip is considered to be of a "striking modern" design. The  concrete tower has fluted sides, with the light shining from a horizontal opening on the seaward side.

The lighthouse is operated and maintained by the port authority of the province of Santa Cruz de Tenerife. It is registered under the international number D2849.51 and has the national identifier of 13025.

Map

See also 

 List of lighthouses in the Canary Islands
 List of lighthouses in Spain

References

External links 

 Comisión de faros

Lighthouses in La Palma
Lighthouses completed in 1993